This is a list of National Rail stations in the ceremonial county of Durham by 2017/2018 entries and exits, based on the UK Office of Rail and Road reports 2016-18. Note that Horden station opened in 2020 so received no entries and exits in this period.

List

See also
Station usage in County Durham
List of United Kingdom railway stations

References

Further reading
 Hoole, K., Railway Stations of the North East (David & Charles, 1985)
 Hill, Norman, Teesside Railways: A View from the Past (Ian Allan, 2001), 
 Young Alan, Lost Stations of Northumberland & Durham (Silver Link, 2011), 
 Durham Railway Stations on Old Picture Postcards (Reflections Of A Bygone Age, 2019), 

Railway stations in County Durham
Durham